The Six Nations land cessions were a series of land cessions by the Haudenosaunee and Lenape which ceded large amounts of land, including both recently conquered territories acquired from other indigenous peoples in the Beaver Wars and ancestral lands to the Thirteen Colonies and the United States. The land ceded covered, partially or in the entire, the U.S. states of New York, Pennsylvania, Maryland, Virginia, West Virginia, Kentucky, Ohio, Tennessee and North Carolina. They were bordered to the west by the Algonquian lands in the Ohio Country, Cherokee lands to the south, and Muscogee and Choctaw lands to the southeast.

The land cessions were accomplished through a series of purchases and treaties negotiated between the Haudenosaunee and the Province of New York (and after the American Revolution, the United States government) between 1682 and 1797. In the Nanfan Treaty of 1701, the Haudenosaunee had ceded their lands north and west of the Ohio River to the Thirteen Colonies, which were in part obtained from the Beaver Wars in the late 17th century. During the period of Indian removal in the early 19th century by the U.S. government, a majority of the Oneida, one of the tribes which made up the Haudenosaunee, migrated to the state of Wisconsin. Other Haudenosaunee migrated to Ontario or Oklahoma. As of the 21st century, the Haudenosaunee live in 20 settlements and 8 reservations in New York, Wisconsin, Oklahoma, Ontario and Quebec.

Background
Before the period of European colonization, the ancestral territory of the Haudenosaunee, a confederation of five indigenous tribes, formed the territory of what is now Upstate New York. The Lenape were spread out in the Hudson and Delaware River valleys along the eastern seaboard of North America. During a period of violent conflict between the Haudenosaunee and a confederation of Algonquian and Wyandot tribes who were allied with the French, the Haudenosaunee were able to acquire lands through conquest which extended as far as the Mississippi River to the west and the Tennessee River to the south. The Lenape, under pressure from European colonial settlements, migrated to the Midwest along the Ohio River and eventually settled along the Wabash River. In 1701, the Haudenosaunee signed the "Deed from the Five Nations to the King, of their Beaver Hunting Ground", more commonly known as the Nanfan Treaty, with the colonial governor of the Province of New York, John Nanfan. The treaty came about during positive relations between the English Crown and the Haudenosaunee, and ceded large amounts of recently lost territory to colonial New York; no attempt was made to settle the newly ceded territories, as in addition to being populated by hostile Algonquian peoples, the French refused to recognize the treaty.

Land cessions
Between 1682 and 1684, Puritan writer and settler William Penn acquired as many as ten individual deeds from the Lenape to territory in colonial Pennsylvania, which formed present-day Chester, Philadelphia, and Bucks counties. These lands were acquired under the Covenant Chain, a series of treaties signed between the Thirteen Colonies and the Haudenosaunee. According to legend, in 1682 Penn signed a treaty under an elm tree with the Lenape known as the Treaty of Shackamaxon. In 1722, the Lieutenant Governor of Virginia, Alexander Spotswood, signed the Treaty of Albany with the Haudenosaunee. The treaty renewed the Covenant Chain and agreed to recognize the Blue Ridge Mountains as the demarcation between colonial Virginia and the territory of the Haudenosaunee. The same year, the Tuscarora joined the confederation of the Haudenosaunee, transforming it into the "Six Nations".

Various colonial governments proved unable to prevent white settlers from moving beyond the Blue Ridge Mountains and settling in the Shenandoah Valley in the 1730s. When the Haudenosaunee objected to encroachment from settlers, they were informed that the agreed demarcation was to prevent them from trespassing east of the Blue Ridge Mountains, and not to prevent colonists from expanding westward. In December 1742, the Haudenosaunee skirmished with some white settlers in the Shenandoah Valley at the Battle of Galudoghson; tensions worsened to the point of an outbreak of war with Virginian settlers when Sir William Gooch, the colonial governor of Virginia, agreed to pay the Haudenosaunee 100 pounds sterling for any settled territory in the Shenandoah Valley which they claimed belong to them. The following year, in the Treaty of Lancaster, the Haudenosaunee sold their remaining claims in the Shenandoah Valley for 200 pounds sterling in gold and 200 pounds sterling worth of goods.

The treaty also allowed for the Haudenosaunee to make peace with the Catawba, whom they had been engaged in intermittent conflict for the past decades. It also was interpreted differently by the Haudenosaunee and the Virginia Colony; with the Virginians believing that the Haudenosaunee had ceded all claims which lay inside the 1609 chartered boundaries of colonial Virginia. The Virginians considered these claims to theoretically extend to the Pacific, or at least up to the Ohio River. On the other hand, the Haudenosaunee understood the treaty to mean that they had only ceded their territory up to the Shenandoah Valley east of the Allegheny Mountains. The negotiations were conducted in the Lancaster courthouse, now occupied by the Soldiers and Sailors Monument, built to commemorate the Union after the American Civil War.

This difference was partly resolved at the Treaty of Logstown in 1752, where the Haudenosaunee recognized the rights of colonists southeast of the Ohio River. Nevertheless, the Cherokee, the Shawnee, and other tribes continued to claim by possession large portions of the region beyond the Allegheny Ridge. In the 1758 Treaty of Easton with the Shawnee ending Braddock's War, the Thirteen Colonies agreed to forbid settlement west of the Alleghenies. The Royal Proclamation of 1763, issued by the British Crown in the aftermath of Pontiac's War, confirmed the region as being forbidden to white settlers. By the Treaty of Fort Stanwix in 1768, the Haudenosaunee sold all their remaining claims between the Ohio and Tennessee Rivers. After the signing of the Nanfan Treaty, small numbers of Haudenosaunee, known as the Seneca-Cayuga, also referred to as the Ohio Seneca or Ohio Cayuga, continued to live in the Ohio Country, and eventually broke away from the confederation. The derogatory term "Mingo" was applied by some non-Native settlers to these Native peoples.

See also
 Aboriginal title in New York
 Aboriginal title in the Thirteen Colonies
 Aboriginal title in the United States

References

External links
Early Treaties with American Indians, University of Nebraska-Lincoln
Joseph Solomon Walton, 1900, Conrad Weiser and the Indian Policy of Colonial Pennsylvania 

Treaties of indigenous peoples of North America
Treaties of the Kingdom of Great Britain
Iroquois
Aboriginal title in the United States
Former Native American populated places in the United States
Native American history of Pennsylvania